Area control centers (ACCs) control IFR air traffic in their flight information region (FIR).

The current list of FIRs and ACCs is maintained by the International Civil Aviation Organization (ICAO). Note that the cited ICAO source gives the shapefile coordinates for each FIR, and also its page source gives a list of current ACCs in text form. The following is the alphabetic list of all ACCs and their FIRs :

See also

 Area control center
 Air corridor
 Air defense identification zone
 Airspace
 Air traffic control
 Airway (aviation)
 Flight information region
 Control area (aviation)
 Control zone
 Terminal control area

References

 
Area Control Centres